This is a list of the mammal species of Vietnam. There are at least 290 mammal species in the country.

The following tags are used to highlight each species' conservation status as assessed on the respective IUCN Red List:

Order: Proboscidea (elephants) 

The elephants comprise three living species and are the largest living land animals.

Family: Elephantidae (elephants)
Genus: Elephas
Asian elephant, E. maximus 
 Indian elephant, E. m. indicus

Order: Sirenia (manatees and dugongs) 

Sirenia is an order of fully aquatic, herbivorous mammals that live in rivers and marine wetlands. It includes four extant species, three manatees and the dugong, and the extinct Stellar's sea cow.

Family: Dugongidae
Genus: Dugong
 Dugong, D. dugon

Order: Scandentia (treeshrews) 

The treeshrews are small mammals native to the tropical forests of Southeast Asia. Although called treeshrews, they are not true shrews and are not all arboreal.

Family: Tupaiidae (tree shrews)
Genus: Dendrogale
 Northern smooth-tailed treeshrew, D. murina 
Genus: Tupaia
 Northern treeshrew, T. belangeri

Order: Dermoptera (colugos) 

The two species of colugos make up the order Dermoptera. They are arboreal gliding mammals found in Southeast Asia.
Family: Cynocephalidae (flying lemurs)
Genus: Galeopterus
Sunda flying lemur, G. variegatus

Order: Primates 

The order Primates contains humans and their closest relatives: lemurs, lorisoids, monkeys, and apes.
 Suborder: Strepsirrhini
 Infraorder: Lemuriformes
 Superfamily: Lorisoidea
 Family: Lorisidae (lorises, bushbabies)
 Genus: Nycticebus
Bengal slow loris, N. bengalensis 
Pygmy slow loris, N. pygmaeus 
Suborder: Haplorhini
Infraorder: Simiiformes
Parvorder: Catarrhini
Superfamily: Cercopithecoidea
Family: Cercopithecidae (Old World monkeys)
Genus: Macaca
Stump-tailed macaque, M. arctoides 
Assam macaque, M. assamensis 
Crab-eating macaque, M. fascicularis 
 Northern pigtail macaque, M. leonina 
Rhesus macaque, M. mulatta 
Subfamily: Colobinae
Genus: Trachypithecus
Indochinese grey langur, T. crepusculus 
Delacour's langur, T. delacouri 
 Indochinese black langur, T. ebenus
 Francois' langur, Trachypithecus francoisi VU
 Germain's langur, Trachypithecus germaini EN
 Hatinh langur, Trachypithecus hatinhensis EN
 Annamese langur, Trachypithecus margarita
Cat Ba langur, T. poliocephalus 
Genus: Pygathrix
 Gray-shanked douc, Pygathrix cinerea CR
 Red-shanked douc, Pygathrix nemaeus EN
 Black-shanked douc, Pygathrix nigripes EN
Genus: Rhinopithecus
 Tonkin snub-nosed langur, Rhinopithecus avunculus CR
Superfamily: Hominoidea
Family: Hylobatidae (gibbons)
Genus: Nomascus
 Black crested gibbon, Nomascus concolor EN
 Yellow-cheeked crested gibbon, Nomascus gabriellae VU
 White-cheeked crested gibbon, Nomascus leucogenys DD
 Eastern black crested gibbon, Nomascus nasutus CR
 Northern buffed-cheeked gibbon, Nomascus annamensis
 Southern white-cheeked gibbon, Nomascus siki EN

Order: Rodentia (rodents) 

Rodents make up the largest order of mammals, with over 40% of mammalian species. They have two incisors in the upper and lower jaw which grow continually and must be kept short by gnawing.
Suborder: Hystricognathi
Family: Hystricidae (Old World porcupines)
Genus: Atherurus
 Asiatic brush-tailed porcupine, Atherurus macrourus
Genus: Hystrix
Malayan porcupine, H. brachyura 
Suborder: Sciurognathi
Family: Sciuridae (squirrels)
Subfamily: Ratufinae
Genus: Ratufa
 Black giant squirrel, Ratufa bicolor
Subfamily: Sciurinae
Tribe: Pteromyini
Genus: Belomys
 Hairy-footed flying squirrel, Belomys pearsonii
Genus: Hylopetes
 Particolored flying squirrel, Hylopetes alboniger EN
 Gray-cheeked flying squirrel, Hylopetes lepidus
 Indochinese flying squirrel, Hylopetes phayrei
 Red-cheeked flying squirrel, Hylopetes spadiceus
Genus: Petaurista
 Spotted giant flying squirrel, Petaurista elegans
Subfamily: Callosciurinae
Genus: Callosciurus
 Finlayson's squirrel, Callosciurus finlaysonii
 Inornate squirrel, Callosciurus inornatus
 Black-striped squirrel, Callosciurus nigrovittatus
Genus: Dremomys
 Perny's long-nosed squirrel, Dremomys pernyi
 Red-hipped squirrel, Dremomys pyrrhomerus
 Asian red-cheeked squirrel, Dremomys rufigenis
Genus: Menetes
 Berdmore's ground squirrel, Menetes berdmorei
Genus: Sundasciurus
 Horse-tailed squirrel, Sundasciurus hippurus
Genus: Tamiops
 Himalayan striped squirrel, Tamiops macclellandi
 Maritime striped squirrel, Tamiops maritimus
 Cambodian striped squirrel, Tamiops rodolphei
 Swinhoe's striped squirrel, Tamiops swinhoei
Family: Platacanthomyidae
Genus: Typhlomys
 Chapa pygmy dormouse, Typhlomys chapensis CR
Family: Spalacidae
Subfamily: Rhizomyinae
Genus: Rhizomys
 Hoary bamboo rat, Rhizomys pruinosus
 Chinese bamboo rat, Rhizomys sinensis
 Large bamboo rat, Rhizomys sumatrensis
Family: Muridae (mice, rats, voles, gerbils, hamsters, etc.)
Subfamily: Murinae
Genus: Bandicota
 Greater bandicoot rat, Bandicota indica
 Savile's bandicoot rat, Bandicota savilei
Genus: Berylmys
 Small white-toothed rat, Berylmys berdmorei
 Bower's white-toothed rat, Berylmys bowersi
 Kenneth's white-toothed rat, Berylmys mackenziei
Genus: Chiromyscus
 Fea's tree rat, Chiromyscus chiropus
Genus: Chiropodomys
 Pencil-tailed tree mouse, Chiropodomys gliroides
Genus: Hapalomys
 Delacour's marmoset rat, Hapalomys delacouri
Genus: Leopoldamys
 Edwards's long-tailed giant rat, Leopoldamys edwardsi
 Long-tailed giant rat, Leopoldamys sabanus
Genus: Maxomys
 Mo's spiny rat, Maxomys moi
 Red spiny rat, Maxomys surifer
Genus: Mus
 Ryukyu mouse, Mus caroli
 Fawn-colored mouse, Mus cervicolor
 Cook's mouse, Mus cookii
 Gairdner's shrewmouse, Mus pahari
 Shortridge's mouse, Mus shortridgei
Genus: Niviventer
 Chestnut white-bellied rat, Niviventer fulvescens
 Lang Bian white-bellied rat, Niviventer langbianis
 Tenasserim white-bellied rat, Niviventer tenaster
Genus: Rattus
 Rice-field rat, Rattus argentiventer
 Polynesian rat, Rattus exulans
 Lesser rice-field rat, Rattus losea
 Himalayan field rat, Rattus nitidus
 Osgood's rat, Rattus osgoodi
 Sikkim rat, Rattus sikkimensis VU
 Tanezumi rat, Rattus tanezumi
Genus: Vandeleuria
 Asiatic long-tailed climbing mouse, Vandeleuria oleracea

Order: Lagomorpha (lagomorphs) 

The lagomorphs comprise two families, Leporidae (hares and rabbits), and Ochotonidae (pikas). Though they can resemble rodents, and were classified as a superfamily in that order until the early 20th century, they have since been considered a separate order. They differ from rodents in a number of physical characteristics, such as having four incisors in the upper jaw rather than two.

Family: Leporidae (rabbits, hares)
Genus: Nesolagus
 Annamite striped rabbit, Nesolagus timminsi
Genus: Lepus
 Burmese hare, Lepus peguensis
 Chinese hare, Lepus sinensis

Order: Eulipotyphla (shrews, hedgehogs, gymnures, moles and solenodons) 

Eulipotyphlans are insectivorous mammals. Shrews and solenodons resemble mice, hedgehogs carry spines, gymnures look more like large rats, while moles are stout-bodied burrowers. 
Family: Erinaceidae (hedgehogs and gymnures)
Subfamily: Galericinae
Genus: Hylomys
 Shrew gymnure, Hylomys sinensis
 Short-tailed gymnure, Hylomys suillus
Family: Soricidae (shrews)
Subfamily: Crocidurinae
Genus: Crocidura
 Crocidura annamitensis
 Grey shrew, Crocidura attenuata
 Southeast Asian shrew, Crocidura fuliginosa
 Crocidura guy
 Crocidura indochinensis
 Crocidura kegoensis
 Crocidura phanluongi
 Crocidura phuquocensis
 Crocidura sokolovi
 Crocidura wuchihensis
 Crocidura zaitsevi
Genus: Suncus
Asian house shrew, S. murinus 
Subfamily: Soricinae
Tribe: Anourosoricini
Genus: Anourosorex
 Chinese mole shrew, Anourosorex squamipes
Tribe: Blarinellini
Genus: Blarinella
Blarinella griselda
Tribe: Nectogalini
Genus: Chimarrogale
 Himalayan water shrew, Chimarrogale himalayica
Genus: Soriculus
 Long-tailed brown-toothed shrew, Soriculus leucops
 Long-tailed mountain shrew, Soriculus macrurus
 Lowe's shrew, Soriculus parca
Family: Talpidae (moles)
Subfamily: Talpinae
Tribe: Talpini
Genus: Euroscaptor
 Greater Chinese mole, Euroscaptor grandis
 Himalayan mole, Euroscaptor micrura
 Small-toothed mole, Euroscaptor parvidens CR

Order: Chiroptera (bats) 

The bats' most distinguishing feature is that their forelimbs are developed as wings, making them the only mammals capable of flight. Bat species account for about 20% of all mammals.
Family: Pteropodidae (flying foxes, Old World fruit bats)
Subfamily: Pteropodinae
Genus: Cynopterus
Lesser short-nosed fruit bat, C. brachyotis 
 Greater short-nosed fruit bat, Cynopterus sphinx
Genus: Megaerops
 Megaerops ecaudatus
 Ratanaworabhan's fruit bat, Megaerops niphanae
Genus: Pteropus
 Small flying-fox, Pteropus hypomelanus
 Lyle's flying fox, Pteropus lylei
Genus: Rousettus
 Geoffroy's rousette, Rousettus amplexicaudatus
 Leschenault's rousette, Rousettus leschenaulti
Subfamily: Macroglossinae
Genus: Macroglossus
 Long-tongued nectar bat, Macroglossus minimus
 Long-tongued fruit bat, Macroglossus sobrinus
Family: Vespertilionidae
Subfamily: Kerivoulinae
Genus: Kerivoula
 Papillose woolly bat, Kerivoula papillosa
 Painted bat, Kerivoula picta
Subfamily: Myotinae
Genus: Myotis
 Large-footed bat, Myotis adversus
 Large myotis, Myotis chinensis
 Lesser large-footed bat, Myotis hasseltii
 Horsfield's bat, Myotis horsfieldii
 Kashmir cave bat, Myotis longipes
 Whiskered myotis, Myotis muricola
 Himalayan whiskered bat, Myotis siligorensis
 Annamit myotis, Myotis annamiticus
Subfamily: Vespertilioninae
Genus: Hypsugo
 Cadorna's pipistrelle, Hypsugo cadornae
 Chinese pipistrelle, Hypsugo pulveratus
Genus: Ia
Great evening bat, I. io 
Genus: Nyctalus
 Common noctule, Nyctalus noctula
Genus: Pipistrellus
 Kelaart's pipistrelle, Pipistrellus ceylonicus
 Java pipistrelle, Pipistrellus javanicus
 Mount Popa pipistrelle, Pipistrellus paterculus
 Least pipistrelle, Pipistrellus tenuis
Genus: Scotomanes
 Harlequin bat, Scotomanes ornatus
Genus: Scotophilus
 Greater Asiatic yellow bat, Scotophilus heathi
Subfamily: Murininae
Genus: Murina
 Round-eared tube-nosed bat, Murina cyclotis
 Hutton's tube-nosed bat, Murina huttoni
 Scully's tube-nosed bat, Murina tubinaris
Subfamily: Miniopterinae
Genus: Miniopterus
 Western bent-winged bat, Miniopterus magnater
 Small bent-winged bat, Miniopterus pusillus
Common bent-wing bat, M. schreibersii 
Family: Molossidae
Genus: Chaerephon
 Wrinkle-lipped free-tailed bat, Chaerephon plicata
Family: Emballonuridae
Genus: Taphozous
 Black-bearded tomb bat, Taphozous melanopogon
 Theobald's tomb bat, Taphozous theobaldi
Family: Megadermatidae
Genus: Megaderma
 Greater false vampire bat, Megaderma lyra
 Lesser false vampire bat, Megaderma spasma
Family: Rhinolophidae
Subfamily: Rhinolophinae
Genus: Rhinolophus
 Intermediate horseshoe bat, Rhinolophus affinis
 Bornean horseshoe bat, Rhinolophus borneensis
 Woolly horseshoe bat, Rhinolophus luctus
 Big-eared horseshoe bat, Rhinolophus macrotis
 Malayan horseshoe bat, Rhinolophus malayanus
 Marshall's horseshoe bat, Rhinolophus marshalli
 Bourret's horseshoe bat, Rhinolophus paradoxolophus VU
 Pearson's horseshoe bat, Rhinolophus pearsoni
 Rufous horseshoe bat, Rhinolophus rouxi
 Chinese rufous horseshoe bat, Rhinolophus sinicus
 Lesser brown horseshoe bat, Rhinolophus stheno
 Little Nepalese horseshoe bat, Rhinolophus subbadius DD
 Thomas's horseshoe bat, Rhinolophus thomasi
Subfamily: Hipposiderinae
Genus: Aselliscus
 Stoliczka's trident bat, Aselliscus stoliczkanus
Genus: Coelops
 Tail-less leaf-nosed bat, Coelops frithii
Genus: Hipposideros
 Great roundleaf bat, Hipposideros armiger
 Dusky roundleaf bat, Hipposideros ater
 Ashy roundleaf bat, Hipposideros cineraceus
 Diadem roundleaf bat, Hipposideros diadema
 Fulvus roundleaf bat, Hipposideros fulvus
 Intermediate roundleaf bat, Hipposideros larvatus
 Pratt's roundleaf bat, Hipposideros pratti
 Lesser great leaf-nosed bat, Hipposideros turpis EN

Order: Pholidota (pangolins) 

The order Pholidota comprises the eight species of pangolin. Pangolins are anteaters and have the powerful claws, elongated snout and long tongue seen in the other unrelated anteater species.

Family: Manidae
Genus: Manis
Sunda pangolin, M. javanica 
Chinese pangolin, M. pentadactyla

Order: Cetacea (whales) 

The order Cetacea includes whales, dolphins and porpoises. They are the mammals most fully adapted to aquatic life with a spindle-shaped nearly hairless body, protected by a thick layer of blubber, and forelimbs and tail modified to provide propulsion underwater.
Suborder: Mysticeti (baleen whales)
Family: Eschrichtiidae
Genus: Eschrichtius
 Western gray whale, Eschrichtius robustus CR
Family: Balaenopteridae (rorquals)
Subfamily: Megapterinae
Genus: Megaptera
 Humpback whale, Megaptera novaeangliae LC
Subfamily: Balaenopterinae
Genus: Balaenoptera
Common minke whale, B. acutorostrata 
 Omura's whale, Balaenoptera omurai DD
 Eden's whale, Balaenoptera edeni DD
 Northern blue whale, Balaenoptera musculus CR
Suborder: Odontoceti (toothed whales)
Superfamily: Platanistoidea
Family: Phocoenidae
Genus: Neophocaena
 Finless porpoise, Neophocaena phocaenoides DD
Family: Kogiidae
Genus: Kogia
 Dwarf sperm whale, Kogia sima
Family: Ziphidae
Subfamily: Hyperoodontinae
Genus: Mesoplodon
 Blainville's beaked whale, Mesoplodon densirostris DD
Family: Delphinidae (marine dolphins)
Genus: Sousa
 Sousa chinensis DD
Genus: Tursiops
 Bottlenose dolphin, Tursiops aduncus DD
Genus: Stenella
 Spinner dolphin, Stenella longirostris
Genus: Delphinus
 Common dolphin, Delphinus capensis
Genus: Lagenodelphis
 Fraser's dolphin, Lagenodelphis hosei DD
Genus: Grampus
 Risso's dolphin, Grampus griseus DD
Genus: Peponocephala
 Melon-headed whale, Peponocephala electra
Genus: Feresa
 Pygmy killer whale, Feresa attenuata DD
Genus: Orcinus
Orca, O. orca 
Genus: Orcaella
Irrawaddy dolphin, O. brevirostris

Order: Carnivora (carnivorans) 

There are over 260 species of carnivorans, the majority of which feed primarily on meat. They have a characteristic skull shape and dentition.
Suborder: Feliformia
Family: Felidae (cats)
Subfamily: Felinae
Genus: Catopuma
Asian golden cat 
Genus: Felis
Jungle cat, F. chaus 
Genus: Pardofelis
Marbled cat, P. marmorata 
Genus: Prionailurus
Leopard cat, P. bengalensis 
Leopard cat, P. bengalensis  presence uncertain
Subfamily: Pantherinae
Genus: Neofelis
Clouded leopard, N. nebulosa  possibly extant
Genus: Panthera
Tiger, P. tigris  possibly extirpated
 Indochinese tiger, P. t. tigris  possibly extirpated
Family: Viverridae (civets, mongooses, etc.)
Subfamily: Paradoxurinae
Genus: Arctictis
Binturong, A. binturong 
Genus: Arctogalidia
Small-toothed palm civet, A. trivirgata 
Genus: Paguma
Masked palm civet, P. larvata 
Genus: Paradoxurus
Asian palm civet, P. hermaphroditus  
Subfamily: Hemigalinae
Genus: Chrotogale
Owston's palm civet, Chrotogale owstoni 
Subfamily: Prionodontinae
Genus: Prionodon
Spotted linsang, Prionodon pardicolor 
Subfamily: Viverrinae
Genus: Viverra
Large-spotted civet, V. megaspila 
Large Indian civet, V. zibetha 
Genus: Viverricula
Small Indian civet, V. indica 
Family: Herpestidae (mongooses)
Genus: Urva
 Javan mongoose, U. javanica  
Crab-eating mongoose, U. urva 
Suborder: Caniformia
Family: Canidae (dogs, foxes)
Genus: Canis
Golden jackal, C. aureus 
Genus: Cuon
Dhole, C. alpinus  possibly extirpated
Genus: Nyctereutes
Raccoon dog, N. procyonoides 
Genus: Vulpes
Red fox, V. vulpes 
Family: Ursidae (bears)
Genus: Helarctos
 Sun bear, H. malayanus 
Genus: Ursus
Asiatic black bear, U. thibetanus 
Family: Mustelidae (mustelids)
Genus: Aonyx
Asian small-clawed otter, A. cinereus 
Genus: Arctonyx
Greater hog badger, A. collaris 
Genus: Lutra
Eurasian otter, L. lutra 
Hairy-nosed otter, L. sumatrana 
Genus: Lutrogale
Smooth-coated otter, L. perspicillata 
Genus: Martes
Yellow-throated marten, M. flavigula 
Genus: Melogale
 Chinese ferret badger, M. moschata 
 Burmese ferret badger, M. personata 
Genus: Mustela
Yellow-bellied weasel, M. kathiah 
 Siberian weasel, M. sibirica 
 Back-striped weasel, M. strigidorsa

Order: Artiodactyla (even-toed ungulates) 

The even-toed ungulates are ungulates whose weight is borne about equally by the third and fourth toes, rather than mostly or entirely by the third as in perissodactyls. There are about 220 artiodactyl species, including many that are of great economic importance to humans.
Family: Tragulidae
Genus: Tragulus
 Lesser mouse-deer, T. kanchil 
 Vietnam mouse-deer, T. versicolor 
Family: Moschidae
Genus: Moschus
 Dwarf musk deer, M. berezovskii 
Family: Cervidae (deer)
Subfamily: Cervinae
Genus: Rusa
Sambar deer, R. unicolor 
Subfamily: Muntiacinae
Genus: Muntiacus
 Fea's muntjac, M. feae 
Indian muntjac, M. muntjak 
 Pu Hoat muntjac, M. puhoatensis 
 Truong Son muntjac, M. truongsonensis 
 Giant muntjac, M. vuquangensis 
Family: Bovidae (cattle, antelope, sheep, goats)
Subfamily: Bovinae
Genus: Bos
Gaur, B. gaurus 
Banteng, B. javanicus 
Genus: Pseudoryx
 Saola, P. nghetinhensis 
Subfamily: Caprinae
Genus: Capricornis
Mainland serow, C. sumatraensis 
 Indochinese serow, C. s. maritimus
Family: Suidae (pigs)
Subfamily: Suinae
Genus: Sus
Wild boar, S. scrofa

Locally extinct 
The following species are locally extinct in the country:
Indian hog deer, Axis porcinus possibly extirpated
Kouprey, Bos sauveli
Wild water buffalo, Bubalus arnee
Sika deer, Cervus nippon possibly extirpated (Vietnamese sika deer, C. n. pseudaxis subspecies)
 Sumatran rhinoceros, Dicerorhinus sumatrensis
 Leopard, Panthera pardus possibly extirpated
 Javan rhinoceros, Rhinoceros sondaicus
Eld's deer, Rucervus eldii possibly extirpated

See also
Wildlife of Vietnam
List of chordate orders
Lists of mammals by region
List of prehistoric mammals
Mammal classification
List of mammals described in the 2000s

References

External links

 Result of Vietnam Fauna: Mammal class

 
Mammals
Vietnam
 Vietnam
Vietnam